Chu, Chu, My Daddy is a 15 episode Taiwanese television drama of the family/comedy genre.
It was broadcast on CTS / GTV between 14 February and 5 March 2007.

Plot
Upon the death of their most beautiful mother in the whole wide world, the rich but helpless orphan sisters are left to fend for themselves against their greedy great-aunt, who is plotting to seize their fortune and kick them out of their big, luxurious house. To counter their great-aunt's evil plot, the sisters hire a man to assume the role of their mother's newly married and sadly widowed husband. This plan may just work and fool their great-aunt's prying eye, if only their half-sister would stop trying to kick their new daddy out of the house.[

Cast
Julian Yang as Liu Fu Rong 劉福榮
Jaline Yeh as Hong Zhen Ni 洪珍妮
Cynthia Wang as Zhou Su Jie 周舒潔
Rou You Xuan (羅幼軒) as Zhou Su Qi 周舒琪
Lu Ting Wei as Su Bo Hao 蘇柏豪
Zhang Shan Jie as Yang Guan Nan 楊光男
Wasir Zhou as Big D 大 D
Huang Wen Xuan as Ah Jian 阿健
Shi Jing Jing as Amy
Ge Wei Ru as Xu Mei Yin 徐媚茵
Alexia Gao as Yan Jia Ren 顏佳人
Huang Tai An as Ah Biao 阿標
Jiang Wei Wen (蔣偉文) as David 大衛
Lin Mei Xiu as Yang's mother 楊媽媽
Xu Xiao Shun (許效舜) as Hong Yu Tou 洪竽頭
Billie as Great-aunt Hu 胡姑婆
Wu Jia Wei (吳珈偉) as Lu Lu 露露

Production credits
Producer: Jiang Feng Hong
Director: Lin Qing Zhen
Screenwriter: Chen Hui Zhen / Xie Su Fen

Music
Opening theme song: "Huai Huai Mei Li Mao" ("壞壞沒禮貌") by Julian Yang
End theme song: "Ai Qing Bu Shi Yi Ge Jian Dan De Ming Ci" ("愛情不是個簡單的名詞") by Julian Yang

References

External links
GTV
CTS
Three-Giant Production

Taiwanese drama television series
2007 Taiwanese television series debuts
2007 Taiwanese television series endings